Ribera del Gállego-Cinco Villas is a Spanish geographical indication for Vino de la Tierra wines located in the wine-producing areas of Ribera del Gállego and the Cinco Villas, in the provinces of Huesca and Zaragoza, in the autonomous region of Aragon, Spain. Vino de la Tierra is one step below the mainstream Denominación de Origen indication on the Spanish wine quality ladder.

The area covered by this geographical indication comprises about 10 municipalities in the province of Huesca and about 20 in the province of Zaragoza (Aragon, Spain).

It acquired its Vino de la Tierra status in 2003.

Grape varieties
 White: Macabeo and Garnacha blanca
 Red: Moristel, Mazuela, Cabernet Sauvignon, Merlot, Tempranillo, Garnacha tinta and Syrah

References

Spanish wine
Wine regions of Spain
Aragonese cuisine
Geography of the Province of Huesca
Geography of the Province of Zaragoza
Wine-related lists
Appellations